The men's 400 metres hurdles event at the 1963 Pan American Games was held at the Pacaembu Stadium in São Paulo on 30 April and 1 May.

Medalists

Results

Heats

Final

References

Athletics at the 1963 Pan American Games
1963